Matossian may refer to:

22776 Matossian, a minor planet

People with the surname
Alexander Matossian, Lebanese politician
Mariam Matossian, Canadian musician
Nouritza Matossian (born 1945), British Cypriot writer, actress, broadcaster and human rights activist
Matossian family, tobacco merchants established in Belgium; see Armenians in Belgium 

Armenian-language surnames